NIFTP can refer to 
National Institute of Fashion Technology Patna
Network-Independent File Transfer Protocol, one of the Coloured Book protocols
Noninvasive follicular thyroid neoplasm with papillary-like nuclear features - a tumour previously classified as papillary thyroid carcinoma